The Aspirational Districts Programme is an initiative by the Government of India implemented by NITI Aayog with the help of various stakeholders to improve the living standards of people in aspirational districts.

History
The Aspirationnal Districts Programme(ADP) was launched in January 2018 by prime minister of India Narendra Modi. The programme is anchored by NITI Aayog in partnership with state governments and district level administrations.

List of Districts 
There are 112 Aspirational districts identified through out the nation covering minimum of one from each state in India.

Key Areas of Focus

 Health & Nutrition
 Education
 Agriculture & Water Resources 
 Financial Inclusion & Skill Development
 Basic Infrastructure

Champions of change portal
In April 2018 the Champions of change portal was set-up by NITI Aayog in partnership with Government of Andhra Pradesh to monitor the progress of the programme in the identified aspirational districts. The delta ranking is the overall ranking of the district. This portal provides the data and comprehensive analysis of key areas of focus of the programme. The ranking is open to public to monitor the performance.

See also
  UNDP's study
 Champions of change portal
 Aspirational Districts Collaborative portal

References 

Public policy
Modi administration initiatives